Carpineti (locally ) is a comune (municipality) in the Province of Reggio Emilia in the Italian region Emilia-Romagna, located about  west of Bologna and about  southwest of Reggio Emilia.

Carpineti borders the following municipalities: Baiso, Casina, Castelnovo ne' Monti, Toano, Viano, Villa Minozzo.

References

External links
  Official website

Cities and towns in Emilia-Romagna